Andrea Bartha is a Hungarian set- and costume-designer, visual artist.

Biography

Andrea Bartha was born in Budapest, Hungary. She studied painting and art-history at the University of Costa Rica, San José. By this time she worked for the Teatro Nacional de Costa Rica, first as a scenic artist, later as a designer. Continuing her studies in Budapest at the ELTE University, Faculty of Human Sciences, she graduated in History and Philosophy of Art, then carried on postgraduate studies in the subject of History and Theory of Theater. She published articles related to visuality on theater-stage. Her book about Theater Design at the Turn of the Century was published by the Hungarian Theater Institute (OSZMI) in 1990.

In line with her theoretical work got involved in underground theater, dance-theater, rock-scene and multimedia experiments, cooperating as actor, dancer, designer and artist with various Hungarian and foreign groups. As one of the founders of the  Pankrator Balett Action Group, created art-performances and happenings in the turn of the 80s-90s.

She works as a  theater-designer since 1991, having credit in more than 100 productions in Hungary and abroad (Czech Republic, Denmark, Philippines, Slovakia, Sweden, UK). Got the Prize for Best Costumes (POSZT) for Leonce and Lena(1991), The Hungarian Theater Critics Award (Színikritikusok Díja) for Das Käthchen von Heilbronn (1993), Tales from the Vienna Woods (1994), The Seagull (1996), The Italian Straw Hat (1997) respectively, the Slovak Critics Dosky Awards for Best Costumes, II. for Best Sets for The Three Sisters, and has got many nominations both in Hungary and other countries. Is critically  praised for her many updating innovative designs made for Shakespeare- Chekhov- and musical-performances. Made „non-replica” costumes for several different Miss Saigon productions around the world (Denmark, Sweden, Philippines, Hungary). Frank Wildhorn choose her to design the sets and costumes for the world-opening of his new musical on Carmen which opened in Prague in 2008 also produced by Andrea's Hungarian costume and set company. "Carmen" is scheduled to have an opening in Broadway. In 2009 Bartha made an individual version for "Spring Awakening", opening in Budapest. In 2010 she designed and produced costumes for the world-opening family musical in Vienna "Sommernachtstraum". In 2013, the Asian opening of "Carmen", the musical. 

She took part in different group exhibitions, and in 2004 had an individual exhibition as a designer titled De/Signs.

Bartha also keeps creating paintings and artworks and taking part in experimental projects an art-exhibitions.

Notable theatrical works from 1991–2010

Prose
The Cherry Orchard Víg Theater Bp 2007
Romeo and Juliet  Új Theater Bp 2006, Szeged National Theater   1999
Four legged horse... Pesti Theater Bp 2005
Mary of Stuart Pesti Theater Bp 2005
120 days of Marquis De Sade( world opening) Puppet Theater 2005
Three Sisters Új Theater 2004, Divadlo Andrea Bagara - Nitra 2003
Comedy of Errors Víg Theater 2004, Prague National Theater 2000
The Virgin of Orleans Hevesi Sándor Theater Zalaegerszeg 2002
Shopping and Fucking Thália Studió 2002
Macbeth Tivoli2001  Víg Theater 1995
Hamlet Divadlo Andrea Bagara - Nitra 2001
A Midsummer Nights Dream Szeged National Theater 2001
The Marriage of Figaro Tivoli Theater 2000
Much Ado About Nothing Prague National Theater 1999, Víg Theater 1999
A Streetcar Named Desire Tivoli Theater 1999
The Tempest  Víg Theater 1999
Bandits Budapest Chamber Theater 1998
The Merchant of Venice  Tivoli Theater 1998
The Seagull Budapest Chamber Theater 1997
As You Like It Bratislava National Theater 1996
Baal Víg Theater 1995
Tales of the Vienna Woods Pesti Theater 1994
Katchen von Heilbronn Víg Tent 1993
Leonce and Lena Budapest Chamber Theater 1991

Operas and musicals
Aida (canceled) Hudební Divadlo Karlín Prague (2011)
A Midsummer Nights Dream (world-opening) Teatro, Wiener Stadthalle 2010
Spring Awakening (non-replica) West Teatrum/Operetta Theater 2009
Carmen (world opening) Hudební Divadlo Karlín Prague 2008
The Gypsy Princess Hudební Divadlo Karlín Prague 2007
Altar Boys (non-replica)  Thália Theater/Operetta Theater 2007
The Gospel of Mary Margitsziget Open-Air Theater 2006
Miss Saigon (non-replica)  Győr 2004, Manila 2000, Stockholm 1998, Copenhagen 1996
Attila Margitsziget Open-Air Theater 2004
Sweet Charity Operetta Studio 2003
Cabaret Operetta Studio 2002
The Last Five Scenes (world-opening) Hungarian State Opera 2000
Italian Straw Hat  Víg Theater 1997
Somewhere in Europe(world-opening) Operetta Theater 1995
My Fair Lady Békéscsaba Jókai Theater 1993
West Side Story Víg Theater 1992

References

External links
 Andrea Bartha's homepage
 Bartha Andrea on Artportal
 Bartha Andrea on Artnet
 Bartha Andrea a PORT.hu-n
 Carmen
 Frank Wildhorn.com
 Hudební Divadlo Karlín
  Andrea Bartha on Broadwayworld.com
 www.playbill.com
 www.theatre.sk
 www.dab.sk
 www.festivaltheatre.cz 

Living people
Year of birth missing (living people)
Hungarian designers
Theatre people from Budapest